Bingo is an unincorporated village in Washington County, Maine, United States.

Notes

Villages in Washington County, Maine
Villages in Maine